Hydrophis laboutei, also known as Laboute's sea snake, is a species of venomous sea snake in the family Elapidae that is native to New Caledonia. The specific epithet laboutei honours Pierre Laboute, a French researcher at the IRD station in Nouméa, who collected the holotype.

Behaviour
The species is viviparous.

Distribution
The snake is found in the marine waters of New Caledonia. The type locality is the Chesterfield Islands in the Coral Sea.

References

 
laboutei
Snakes of New Caledonia
Reptiles described in 2000